Kirovohrad Oblast Football Federation is the governing body of Association football in the region of Kirovohrad Oblast, Ukraine. The federation is a member of the Regional Council of FFU and the collective member of the FFU itself.

Previous Champions

1992    FC Chervona Zirka Kirovohrad
1993    FC Chervona Zirka Kirovohrad (2) 
1993-94 FC Lokomotyv Znamianka
1994-95 FC Kooperator Novomyrhorod
1995-96 FC Lokomotyv Znamianka (2)
1996-97 FC Burevisnyk-Elbrus Kirovohrad
1997-98 FC Burevisnyk-Elbrus Kirovohrad (2)
1998-99 FC Yulia-Novator Bobrynets
1999    FC Polihraftekhnika-2 Oleksandriya
2000    FC Artemida Kirovohrad
2001    FC Ikar-MAKBO 94 Kirovohrad
2002    FC Ikar-MAKBO Kirovohrad (2)
2003    FC Ikar-MAKBO Kirovohrad (3)
2004    FC Ikar-MAKBO Kirovohrad (4)
2005    FC Zorya Haivoron
2006    FC Saturn Chervona Kamianka
2007    FC Oleksandriya-Ametyst
2008    FC Oleksandriya-Ametyst (2)
2009    FC Zorya Haivoron (2)
2010    FC UkrAhroKom Holovkivka
2011    FC Lokomotyv-Khlibodar Znamianka (3)
2012    FC Burevisnyk Petrove
2013    FC Burevisnyk Petrove (2)
2014    FC AF Pyatykhatska Volodymyrivka
2015    FC Inhulets-2 Petrove (2)
2016    FC Nova Politsiya Kropyvnytskyi
2017    FC Vilshanka
2018    FC UkrAhroKom Holovkivka (2)
2019    FC Zirka Kropyvnytskyi

Top winners
 4 - FC Ikar-MAKBO (94) Kirovohrad
 3 - FC Lokomotyv-(Khlibodar) Znamianka
 2 - 7 clubs (UkrAhroKom, Inhulets-2, Burevisnyk, Zorya, Ametyst, Burevisnyk-Elbrus, Chervona Zirka)
 1 - 8 clubs (Zirka, Vilshanka, Nova Politsiya, Saturn, Artemida, Polihraftekhnika-2, Yulia-Novator, Kooperator)

Professional clubs
 FC Dynamo Kirovohrad, 1946, 1962
 FC Zirka Kropyvnytskyi, 1958-1961, 1963-1968
 FC Shakhter Oleksandriya, 1962-1968
 FC Oleksandriya

See also
 FFU Council of Regions

References

External links
 Kirovohrad Oblast Football Federation

Football in the regions of Ukraine
Football governing bodies in Ukraine
Sport in Kirovohrad Oblast